The Kourou is a river in French Guiana, discharging into the Atlantic Ocean. The town of Kourou is located at its estuary, which is generally used as a pleasure port.

Like the river Amazon, it has brown, muddy waters due to sediments picked up from the forest.  A great many different fish species live in the river and are used in the local diet.

Like many Guyanaise rivers, it is polluted by mercury, as a result of clandestine gold mining.

References

Rivers of French Guiana
Rivers of France